Asoha is a village in Purwa tehsil of Unnao district, Uttar Pradesh, India. It is located about 16 km north of Purwa, the tehsil headquarters, and 51 km east of Unnao, the district headquarters. The main crops grown here are wheat, barley, gram, juwar, paddy, and pulses, and irrigation is provided by a canal as well as by tanks. The soil here is mostly clay. As of 2011, the population of Asoha is 3,709, in 856 households.

Asoha is the headquarters of a community development block, which was first inaugurated on 1 July 1956 in order to oversee implementation of India's Five-Year Plans at a local and rural level. As of 2011, the block comprises 122 rural villages (including Asoha itself), with a total population of 153,798 people in 30,885 households. Asoha is also the headquarters of a nyaya panchayat.

History 
According to C.A. Elliott, the name "Asoha" is derived from that of Ashwatthama, the figure in the Mahabharata, who is said to have rested here for a time after the murder of Draupadi's children. Asoha was historically the seat of a pargana, which is first attested during the reign of the Mughal emperor Akbar in the late 16th century. At the turn of the 20th century, Asoha had five temples, a police station, a cattle pound, and a primary school, as well as "unusually extensive" groves of mango and mahua trees.

The 1961 census recorded Asoha as comprising 4 hamlets, with a total population of 1,868 (981 male and 887 female), in 304 households and 286 physical houses. The area of the village was given as 861 acres. It had a police force of 1 sub-inspector, 1 head constable, and 13 constables at the time.

Culture 
A legendary figure named Astik is worshipped in Asoha. He is said to have been born during the Dvapara Yuga period, and that at the time of the great Sarpa Satra performed by Janamejaya, Astik received a boon from the serpent Takshak, who promised him that men bitten by snakes would recover if they took his name.

Villages 
Asoha CD block has the following 122 villages:

References

Villages in Unnao district
Community development blocks in India